Barford Tigers Hockey Club is a field hockey club that is based at Hamstead Hall Academy in Birmingham. The club was founded in 1966.

The club runs five men's teams, two ladies teams and two veterans teams. with the men's first XI playing in the Men's England Hockey League Division 1 North.

References

English field hockey clubs
1966 establishments in England
Sport in Birmingham, West Midlands